Triantafilopoulos or Triantafyllopoulos is a Greek surname. The feminine form is Triantafyllopoulou. It can refer to:

 Effie Triantafilopoulos, Canadian politician
 Konstantinos Triantafyllopoulos (born 1983), Greek footballer
 Kostas Triantafyllopoulos (born 1956), Greek actor
 Makis Triantafyllopoulos (born 1954), Greek journalist
 Nikolaos Triantafyllopoulos (1918–1998), Greek sports shooter

Surnames
Surnames of Greek origin
Greek-language surnames